Jamal Piaras Lewis (born 25 January 1998) is a professional footballer who plays as a left back for Premier League club Newcastle United. Born and raised in England, he plays international football for Northern Ireland.

Early life
When he was young, Lewis was a talented athlete competing at national level for his age-group over 800m and 1500m. He represented England Schools in athletics and finished second in the English Schools' U17 cross-country in 2014.

Club career

Luton Town
Lewis started his football career as a youth player with his home-town club Luton Town, with whom he won the Aarau Masters, a European 5-a-side Under-11 Championship in 2009. He left Luton Town in 2013 to focus on his prospects as a national-level 800-metre runner.

Norwich City
Lewis returned to professional football in 2014, signing for Norwich City.

During the 2016–17 season, he played for the Norwich U23 team. At the end of the 2016–17 season, Lewis signed a new contract until 2021. In December 2017, Lewis made his senior debut for Norwich City against Brentford, coming on as a substitute for Marco Stiepermann. On Boxing Day 2017, he made his first start for Norwich against Birmingham City. He scored his first senior goal in the 93rd minute of an FA Cup third round replay against Chelsea in January 2018.

Lewis was named the EFL Young Player of the Month for September 2018, and in October 2018, he was rewarded with a new long-term contract which ran until June 2023.

In March 2019 he was named in the 2018–19 PFA Championship Team of the Year, alongside team-mates Max Aarons and Teemu Pukki. Lewis made 28 appearances for Norwich City in the 2019–20 Premier League. In August 2020, Norwich rejected a £10 million bid from Liverpool for Lewis.

Newcastle United
Lewis signed a five-year contract with Newcastle United on 8 September 2020. His performances though were often unconvincing and he quickly fell out of favour, so much so that in January 2022 he was omitted from the 25-player squad list for the remainder of the season.

International career
Though born in England, Lewis was eligible to play for Northern Ireland through his Belfast-born mother. He first represented the country in 2016, making three appearances for the U19 team. In June 2017, he was called up to the U21 team and made his U21 debut against Estonia.

In March 2018, he was called up to the Northern Ireland senior squad for the first time. He made his senior international debut in a 2–1 friendly win over South Korea on 24 March 2018.

On 9 October 2021, Lewis was sent off in the first half in an eventual 2–0 loss to Switzerland. His first yellow was for a rash challenge on Breel Embolo, but his second was for timewasting after he struggled to find a teammate from a throw-in. Manager Ian Baraclough said that the decision to send Lewis off was "diabolical" and it changed the course of the game.

Career statistics

Club

International

Honours
Norwich City
EFL Championship: 2018–19

Individual
EFL Young Player of the Month: September 2018
EFL Team of the Season: 2018–19
PFA Team of the Year: 2018–19 Championship

References

External links

Profile at the Norwich City F.C. website
Profile at the Irish Football Association website
Profile at the World Athletics website

1998 births
Living people
Footballers from Luton
Association footballers from Northern Ireland
Northern Ireland youth international footballers
Northern Ireland under-21 international footballers
Northern Ireland international footballers
English footballers
Association football defenders
Norwich City F.C. players
Newcastle United F.C. players
English Football League players
Premier League players
Black British sportsmen
English people of Northern Ireland descent